The House by the Sea is a 2017 French drama film directed by Robert Guédiguian. It was screened in the main competition section of the 74th Venice International Film Festival.

Cast
 Ariane Ascaride as Angèle Barberini
 Jean-Pierre Darroussin as Joseph
 Gérard Meylan as Armand
 Jacques Boudet as Martin, father of Yvan
 Anaïs Demoustier as Bérangère
 Robinson Stévenin as Benjamin
 Yann Trégouët as Yvan
 Geneviève Mnich as Suzanne, mother of Yvan
 Fred Ulysse as Maurice, the dying father
 Diouc Koma as a soldier
 Haylana Bechir as a young refugee
 Ayoub Oaued as first refugee child
 Giani Rouxas as second refugee child
 Esther Seignon as Blanche
 Théau Courtès as adjutant

Reception
On review aggregator website Rotten Tomatoes, the film holds an approval rating of 100% based on 7 reviews, and an average rating of 6.3/10. On Metacritic, the film has a weighted average score of 64 out of 100, based on 4 critics, indicating "generally favorable reviews".

References

External links
 

2017 films
2017 drama films
2010s French-language films
French drama films
Films directed by Robert Guédiguian
2010s French films